Nicholas Bourbon may refer to:

 Nicholas Bourbon (the elder) (1503–1550), French neo-Latin poet; Grand uncle to "the younger"
 Nicholas Bourbon (the younger) (1574–1644), French neo Latin poet; Member of the Académie française